Dyson Sphere Program is a factory simulation game developed by Youthcat Studio released for Microsoft Windows in January 2021 in early access.

Gameplay

Dyson Sphere Program takes place in a futurist science fiction where a society exists primarily in a virtual computer space, which demands a great deal of power and computational ability. To expand that, they have sent one of their members, the player-character, into the real universe to construct a Dyson sphere from resources in a nearby star cluster that will supply that power.

The game generates a random star cluster that includes stars and their orbiting planets and moons with various resources based on biome type at the start of a new game, and designates one planet with the more fundamental resources for the player to start at. The player, controlling a mechanized suit, can gather resources such as iron, copper, and oil; build out fundamental components such as steel plates, gears, and electronic circuits; and then combine these into building structures that include assembly plants, transport systems, and power devices. The player can start to construct factories that can generate these items automatically, making sure that the factory has sufficient power and resources to continue running automatically. Products also are used to progress research into new technologies that expand the range of components and buildings that can be made as well as the capabilities of the mechanized suit, which also must be kept powered to continue to expand production. Eventually, these allow the player to leave the starting planet and begin developing factories to harvest more exotic resources from other planets which can then be transported across the star system, ultimately leading to the moment where components for the Dyson sphere are finally constructed and launched into their target orbit.

Development
Dyson Sphere Program was developed by the five-member team of Youthcat Studio, located in Chongqing, China. The studio had been started by Mao Mao, a graduate from Chongqing University and Zhou Xun, who was already working in the games industry. The two had met previously and had a shared interest in science fiction. They were inspired by the space-based 4x game Stellaris, which included the construction of Dyson spheres as part of its gameplay, and had thought about a game concept of building a Dyson sphere piece by piece. When the film The Wandering Earth was released in early 2019, the two decided the time was right to start development in earnest on this game concept. They spent several months prototyping the concept before committing towards full-time game development. Xun quit his job to form Youthcat Studio with Mao Mao, and they hired three additional developers to help. The project was funded with Xun's own savings, giving them a maximum two-year window to prepare the game for a release state. Near mid-2020, as they were approaching the end of this two-year period, they met with Gamera Game, a Chinese publisher that supports indie game development. Gamera helped Youthcat with planning for an international release of the title and enlisting voice actors who had been in The Wandering Earth to perform for the game.

The game was launched in early access on January 21, 2021. Youthcat Studio said their intention was to have about a year of development in the early access period before considering the game complete. Planned features include adding combat against hostiles on various planets and the ability to customize the mechanized suit (the latter of which was implemented in January 2022).

Reception
Within four days of going live with early access on Steam and WeGame, Youthcat reported they had sold over 200,000 copies, and over 350,000 by the first week. It was the top-selling game on Steam the week of its debut. By September 2021, sales had reached over 1.7 million units. Rock Paper Shotgun have noted that the Factory aspects of the game take many cues from Factorio.

References

Early access video games
Upcoming video games
Construction and management simulation games
Video games about virtual reality
Video games developed in China
Indie video games
Video games set in outer space
Video games set in the future
Windows games
Windows-only games